The IV National Assembly of Venezuela was a meeting of the legislative branch of Venezuelan federal government, comprising the National Assembly of Venezuela. It is meeting in Caracas after 2015 Venezuelan parliamentary election.

Major events
2017 Venezuelan protests (2012 – present)
2017 Venezuelan constitutional crisis (29 March 2017)
2017 Venezuelan National Assembly attack (5 July 2017)
2017 Venezuelan referendum (16 July 2017)
2017 Venezuelan Constituent Assembly election (30 July 2017) 
Arrest and detention of Juan Requesens (7 August 2018)
Venezuelan presidential crisis (10 January 2019 – ongoing)
Statute Governing the Transition to Democracy (5 February 2019)
2019 Venezuelan Amnesty Law
Operación Alacrán (1 December 2019 – 5 January 2020)
Venezuelan National Assembly Delegated Committee election (5 January 2020)

Leadership

Parties

Color codes

Members 
Note: (E) = Deputy substitute

Opposition 
The Venezuelan system is presidential, so although the PSUV has a minority in the Assembly, they remain the government.

Oficialism

Dissent

Representatives per state, 2016-2021

See also 
 I National Assembly of Venezuela
 II National Assembly of Venezuela
 III National Assembly of Venezuela
 V National Assembly of Venezuela

References

National Assembly (Venezuela)